Osceola is an unincorporated community in Warren County, in the U.S. state of Ohio.

History
Osceola was platted in 1838, and named after Osceola, the leader of the Seminole in Florida. Variant spellings have included "Oceola" and "Osseola".

References

Unincorporated communities in Warren County, Ohio